The Richmond Virginia Temple is a temple of the Church of Jesus Christ of Latter-day Saints under construction in Richmond, Virginia.

History 
The intent to construct the temple was announced by church president Russell M. Nelson on April 1, 2018.  The Richmond Virginia Temple was announced concurrently with 6 other temples. At the time, the number of operating or announced temples was 189. 

On April 11, 2020, a groundbreaking to signify beginning of construction was held, with Randall K. Bennett, president of the church's North America Northeast Area, presiding. Due to the COVID-19 pandemic, the groundbreaking ceremony was limited to a handful of leaders and was broadcast to meetinghouses in the temple district as originally planned.

See also 

 The Church of Jesus Christ of Latter-day Saints in Virginia
 Comparison of temples of The Church of Jesus Christ of Latter-day Saints
 List of temples of The Church of Jesus Christ of Latter-day Saints
 List of temples of The Church of Jesus Christ of Latter-day Saints by geographic region
 Temple architecture (Latter-day Saints)

References

External links 

 Church Newsroom of The Church of Jesus Christ of Latter-day Saints
 Richmond Virginia Temple at ChurchofJesusChristTemples.org

Temples (LDS Church) in the United States
Proposed religious buildings and structures of the Church of Jesus Christ of Latter-day Saints
The Church of Jesus Christ of Latter-day Saints in the United States
Religious buildings and structures in Richmond, Virginia
21st-century Latter Day Saint temples
Proposed buildings and structures in Virginia
Buildings and structures under construction in the United States